Meghann Shaughnessy was the defending champion, but decided to compete in Sydney.

Paola Suárez won the title by defeating Silvia Farina Elia 3–6, 6–4, 7–6(7–5) in the final.

Seeds

Draw

Finals

Top half

Bottom half

References
 Official results archive (ITF)
 Official results archive (WTA)

Canberra Women's Classic – Singles